The Phantom Cowboy is the sixth studio album by Belgian rock band K's Choice. The album was released on 5 February 2015 in much of Europe by Wallaby Records, LLC and distributed by Sony, and on 18 September 2015 in the US, UK, Canada, and Ireland by MPress Records.

Music
Rather than develop music and lyrics individually and then bring them together as they had in past, siblings Sam and Gert Bettens decided to write the music and lyrics together for this album. "We thought it would be fun to experiment with being in one room and feeding off each other," Sam explains. "It turned out to be a great decision." Alain Johannes produced the album.

On 6 February 2015, K's Choice released the first single, "Private Revolution". A teaser video for "Private Revolution" was released to YouTube on 5 February 2015.[3] The video features concert and prior video footage. A video for the track "Bag of Concrete" was released on 12 June 2015. On 11 September 2015, a video for the track "Perfect Scar" was released on YouTube.

On 5 December 2015, Belgian concert hall, Ancienne Belgique, live-streamed K's Choice's concert at its venue.

In March 2016, K's Choice embarked on their first US tour in a decade in support of The Phantom Cowboy with longtime friends and, more recently, labelmates A Fragile Tomorrow.

Track listing

Chart performance

Weekly charts

Year-end charts

References 

2015 albums
K's Choice albums
Albums produced by Alain Johannes